Fidel A. Vargas (born August 12, 1968) is an American financial executive and former mayor who is the president and CEO of the Hispanic Scholarship Fund (HSF), the nation's leading provider of scholarships and services for Latino students.

Prior to joining HSF, Vargas was a founding partner in 2000 of Centinela Capital Partners, a New York-based private equity asset management firm that focused on investing and managing nearly $1 billion in minority-owned funds. Prior to joining Centinela, Vargas was a managing director with TMG Advisors, an investment/consulting firm. He was also a founding principal and managing director of Reliant Equity Investors, a private equity investment firm.

In 1992, at age 23, Vargas was elected mayor of Baldwin Park, California, defeating Bette Lowes. He was one of the youngest elected officials in history.  Vargas was reelected in 1994 but did not run for reelection in 1997.

Vargas graduated with honors from Harvard University with an A.B. in social studies and received his M.B.A. from the Harvard Business School.
 
Vargas has served on the boards of the Latino Theater Company in Los Angeles; the New America Alliance; Sponsors for Education Opportunities; and Operation HOPE, Inc.  He served on President Bill Clinton's Advisory Council on Social Security; President George W. Bush's Commission on Strengthening Social Security; and President Bush and President Barack Obama's Commission on Presidential Scholars.  Vargas currently serves on the boards of the California Community Foundation, the Latino Donor Collaborative, and the Los Angeles Theatre Center.

Time magazine named Vargas as one of the Top 50 Young Leaders in the United States, Hispanic magazine named him one of the Top 30 Young Hispanics in the United States, and he was named one of the country's 100 most influential Hispanics by Hispanic Business Magazine.

Vargas has three children: Max, Julian, and Nicolás.

References

Mayors of places in California
People from Baldwin Park, California
Living people
American chief executives of education-related organizations
Harvard Business School alumni
1968 births
Hispanic and Latino American mayors in California
Hispanic and Latino American politicians